Leandro Micael Gomes Albano (born 26 May 1992 in Lisbon)  is a Portuguese footballer who plays for Pedras Salgadas as a right back.

Football career
Formed at Sporting's youth system, he was not given a professional contract, so he signed with Mafra in  August 2011. The next season, he moved to Braga, where he made his professional debut at 7 October 2012 in a match against Penafiel. After two seasons, he moved back to Lisbon, joining Atletico CP.

References

External links

1992 births
People from Sintra
Living people
Portuguese footballers
Association football defenders
C.D. Mafra players
S.C. Braga B players
Atlético Clube de Portugal players
Liga Portugal 2 players
S.C. Freamunde players
C.D. Trofense players
AD Oliveirense players
Juventude de Pedras Salgadas players
Sportspeople from Lisbon District